Südfriedhof is, with an area of 82 hectares, the largest cemetery in Leipzig. It is located in the south of Leipzig in the immediate vicinity of the Völkerschlachtdenkmal. The Südfriedhof is, along with the Ohlsdorf Cemetery in Hamburg and the Südwestkirchfriedhof Stahnsdorf in Berlin, the largest park-like cemetery in Germany.

History

The plans for the cemetery began in 1879. Initially it was created on an area of 54 hectares under the direction of horticultural director of Leipzig, Otto Wittenberg and the architect Hugh Licht. The conduct of ways is in form of a linden leaf, which reflects the Slavic name of Leipzig "The Town of the Linden", and fulfil the aims of Art Nouveau as a Gesamtkunstwerk.

With the rapid development of the city during its industrialisation, incorporation of nearby settlements and the consequent steady population growth a new cemetery was needed. On 1 June 1886 the Südfriedhof was opened by Mayor Otto Robert Georgi after the Nordfriedhof (North Cemetery) was opened in 1881. Shortly after, the first burial was made and the grave is still preserved in the I. Division. However, this burial ground was very unpopular at first. Many citizens of Leipzig chose to be buried at the Neuer Johannisfriedhof (New St. John's Cemetery) but this changed when it began to fill up and the trees on the Südfriedhof became greater and the proposed park character was recognisable.

Visitors to the nearby Völkerschlachtdenkmal notice at first the chapel with its 60 meter high bell tower, which was opened in 1910. The Neo-Romanesque building ensemble, was built on a filled-up plateau and under the direction of Leipzig's building director Otto Wilhelm Scharenberg. It had the Romanesque Maria Laach Abbey in the Eifel region as a model and is the largest cemetery monument in Germany. The symmetrical complex of chapel facilities, crematorium and columbarium blends inconspicuously into the overall picture and is justified to the main north–south axis of the cemetery. Until 1924 the cemetery was enlarged to 63 hectares. During World War II the most recent cemetery extension was made to the present area of 82 hectares. They buried the 3474 victims of the World War II bombing of Leipzig in today's XXVIII. Division.

Particularly noteworthy are the historical monuments, some of which were by artists such as Max Klinger, Fritz Behn, Max Lange or Carl Seffner created in various styles.

Flora and fauna

Due to the park-like character of the cemetery you find several kinds of trees, such as sweetgum, Mahonia, Metasequoia, Kentucky coffeetree, ginkgo and several kinds of Tilia. Furthermore, you can find about 9,000 Rhododendrons, which are up to four meters high. At the cemetery 60 nesting bird species are listed. There are numerous red squirrel and in the quiet morning and evening hours rabbits or foxes can be seen.

Notable Persons

 Albrecht Alt, theologian
 Fritz Baedeker, publisher
 Julius Blüthner, piano maker, entrepreneur
 Max Bürger, medical doctor
 Franz Delitzsch, theologian and Hebraist
 Fred Delmare, actor
 Paul Flechsig, neuroanatomist, psychiatrist and neuropathologist
 Christian Fürchtegott Gellert, poet
 Samuel Heinicke, originator in Germany of systematic education for the deaf
 Johannes Hertel, Indologist
 Arthur Hoffmann, politician and resistance fighter
 Sigfrid Karg-Elert, composer
 Alfred Kästner, politician and resistance fighter
 Oskar Kellner, agricultural scientist, chemist, animal psychologist
 Rudolf Kittel, theologist and editor of the Biblia Hebraica
 Hugo Licht, architect of numerous buildings in Leipzig
 Julius Lips, ethnologist
 Kurt Masur, conductor
 Hans Meyer, geographer and first man on Mount Kilimanjaro
 Herrmann Julius Meyer, publisher
 Arthur von Oettingen, physicist and music theorist 
 Erwin Payr, surgeon
 Max Robitzsch, meteorological scientist and arctic researcher
 Renate and Roger Rössing, photographers
 Carl Seffner, sculptor, (e.g. Johann Sebastian Bach monument in front of thomaskirche)
 Georg Schumann, politician and resistance fighter
 Karl Straube, Thomaskantor and organist
 Karl Sudhoff, historian on medicine
 Georg Thieme, publisher and founder of Thieme Medical Publishers
 Stanislaw Trabalski, politician
 Werner Tübke, painter
 Marinus van der Lubbe, Dutch council communist accused of, and eventually executed for, setting fire to the German Reichstag building on February 27, 1933, an event known as the Reichstag fire.
 Wilhelm Wundt, medical doctor, psychologist, physiologist, philosopher, known today as one of the founding figures of modern psychology
 Erich Zeigner, politician

External links

 Website (German)
 Map with prominent graves on Südfriedhof (German)
 Detailed essay on the history of the Südfriedhof (German)
 

Cemeteries in Leipzig
Lutheran cemeteries
Tourist attractions in Leipzig
Protected areas of Saxony
Art Nouveau architecture in Germany
Art Nouveau cemeteries
Lutheran cemeteries in Germany